Soraya Vieira Thronicke (born 1 June 1973) is a Brazilian politician and lawyer. She has spent her political career representing Mato Grosso do Sul, having served as senator for that State since 2019.

Personal life
As is common in her home state, Thronicke is of German Brazilian descent. Born in Dourados, Thronicke grew up in Campo Grande. Before becoming a politician Thronicke was a lawyer. She is married and has a son. Thronicke's family owns multiple motels throughout Mato Grosso do Sul.

Political career
Thronicke was the only woman on the ballot in the entire state that election year. Strong themes of Thronicke's senate campaign agenda included anti-corruption and encouraging private property.

Ideologically Thronicke identifies as economically liberal and socially conservative. In 2018, she was a supporter of Jair Bolsonaro, and campaigned with him on his run for president. She was a candidate for president in the 2022 election, having been nominated by the Brazil Union party.

On 2 October 2022, Thronicke failed to reach the run-off with 0.51% of the vote.

Notes

References

1973 births
Living people
People from Dourados
Brazilian people of German descent
Brazilian women lawyers
Brazilian women in politics
New Party (Brazil) politicians
Social Liberal Party (Brazil) politicians
Brazil Union politicians
Members of the Federal Senate (Brazil)
21st-century Brazilian lawyers
Candidates for President of Brazil